The 1994 Wyoming gubernatorial election took place on November 8, 1994. Incumbent Democratic Governor Mike Sullivan was unable to seek a third term because of newly imposed term limits, and instead ran for the U.S. Senate. State Senate President Jim Geringer won the Republican primary and faced Secretary of State Kathy Karpan, the Democratic nominee, in the general election. Aided by the nationwide Republican wave, Geringer defeated Karpan in a landslide, marking the first time since Governor Stanley Hathaway's re-election in 1970 that a Republican won a gubernatorial election in Wyoming.

Democratic primary

Candidates
 Kathy Karpan, Wyoming Secretary of State

Results
Karpan won the nomination unopposed.

Republican primary

Candidates
Jim Geringer, State Senator
John Perry, former State Senator
Charles Scott, State Senator
Lloyd Baker, surveyor

Results

References

Wyoming
1994
Gubernatorial